Lynn Arturi-Chiavaro (born 1954) is an American former basketball coach.  She was head coach of Army women's basketball from 1987 to 1998.

Playing career
Originally from Port Chester, New York, Chiavaro graduated from Maria Regina High School. She then attended Northeastern University, lettering in basketball from 1973 to 1976 and also playing lacrosse. Former Northeastern men's basketball coach Jim Calhoun once rated Chiavaro as one of the best shooters he had ever seen. Chiavaro graduated from Northeastern in 1977 with a degree in physical science.

In 1978 Chiavaro was drafted by the New York Stars of the short lived Women's Professional Basketball League.

Coaching career
Chiavaro became an assistant coach at Iona College during the 1981 and 1982 seasons before becoming an assistant at Army in 1982 under Harold Johnson. In 1987, Chiavaro was promoted to head coach. In 11 seasons, she had a 133–175 record from 1987 to 1998.

After leaving Army, Chiavaro became a financial advisor with Northwestern Mutual in 2000.

Head coaching record
Sources:

References

External links

Professional statistics at StatsCrew.com

1954 births
Northeastern Huskies women's basketball players
Living people
American women's basketball coaches
Army Black Knights women's basketball coaches
People from Port Chester, New York
Basketball coaches from New York (state)
Women's Professional Basketball League players